Podolepis canescens (common names - grey podolepis,  large copper wire daisy) is a herb in the Asteraceae family, which is found in South Australia, the Northern Territory, New South Wales and Victoria.  PlantNet also states that it is found in Western Australia, but FloraBase states that the name is misapplied in Western Australia, based on Jeanes (2015). 

It was first described in 1838 by Allan Cunningham and published in Augustin Pyramus de Candolle's Prodromus Systematis Naturalis Regni Vegetabilis. Jeffrey Jeanes (2015) recognises only specimens from New South Wales as belonging to the species.

References

External links 

 Podolepis canescens occurrence data from the Australasian Virtual Herbarium

canescens
Flora of New South Wales
Flora of South Australia
Plants described in 1838